Little Portugal is a neighbourhood in Montreal, Quebec, Canada. It is situated in the western portion of the borough of Le Plateau Mont-Royal.

Portuguese businesses can be found along several blocks of Saint Laurent Boulevard between Pine and Marie-Anne Street. The Portuguese area has largely absorbed what used to be the traditional Jewish neighbourhood. According to the 2006 Census, there were over 46,000 people of Portuguese descent in Montreal.

Parc du Portugal
Parc du Portugal is located on Saint Laurent Boulevard between Marie-Anne Street and Vallières Street. It was founded in 1956, created by landscape architect Carlos R. Martinez to honour the city's Portuguese community. It was renovated in 2003 to mark the fiftieth anniversary of the Portuguese community in Montreal. It features a small drinking fountain by artist Rui Dias. Prominent Canadian poet and musician Leonard Cohen lived in a home adjacent to the park, on St. Dominique Street, for much of his life.

Gallery

References

Historic Jewish communities
Neighbourhoods in Montreal
Ethnic enclaves in Quebec
European-Canadian culture in Montreal
Portuguese neighborhoods
Le Plateau-Mont-Royal
Portuguese-Canadian culture
1956 establishments in Quebec